Patrick Edward Burke (May 13, 1901 – July 7, 1965) was a Major League Baseball third baseman who played in one game on September 23,  with the St. Louis Browns. In that game, Burke pinch hit for regular third baseman Gene Robertson, and went 0–3 with a run batted in.

References

External links

1901 births
1965 deaths
Major League Baseball third basemen
Baseball players from St. Louis
St. Louis Browns players